Radford is a hamlet in the Wychavon district of Worcestershire, England. It is 1 mile SSW of Inkberrow. In 2013, Landscan population maps show there to be as little as 21 people living in Radford. In 1870-72 it had a population of 80.

Climate
Like much of the British isles, Radford has a temperate maritime climate.

References

Hamlets in Worcestershire
Wychavon